The Ditrău is a right tributary of the river Mureș in Transylvania, Romania. It discharges into the Mureș in the village Ditrău.

References

Rivers of Romania
Rivers of Harghita County